Margaret McCoubrey (1880–1955) was an Irish suffragist and active participant of the co-operative movement.

Life
McCoubrey nee Mearns was born on 5 January 1880 in Elderslie, near Glasgow in Scotland.

McCoubrey married an Irish trade unionist and moved to Belfast.  There, in 1910 she joined the Irish Women's Suffrage Society (established in the city by Isabella Tod in 1872), and was an active militant alongside Elizabeth McCracken (the writer "L.A.M. Priestley") and Elizabeth Bell (the first woman in Ireland to qualify as a doctor and gynaecologist). When in 1913, Dorothy Evans started organizing the Women's Social and Political Union (WPSU), she followed them in joining the British organization, and travelled to London as a representative of women in the north of Ireland.  The theme of self-sacrifice was paramount amongst suffragettes and Margaret McCoubrey claimed that suffragettes were continuing an Irish tradition of violent protest.

At the outbreak of the First World War, she disagreed with the WSPU's orders to cease agitation, and instead founded a branch of the Irish Women's Suffrage Society in Belfast. She joined the peace movement and gave refuge to conscientious objectors. At that time, the majority of women in Ulster perceived pacifism as unpatriotic and female suffrage as unimportant in comparison with the dangers threatening wartime Europe. As a result, only a few suffragists remained active during the War. McCoubrey single-handedly ran a month-long peace and suffrage campaign in Belfast in August 1917, inspired by her belief that 'a woman looking down on a battlefield would not see dead Germans or dead Englishmen but so many mother's sons'.

She became general secretary of the Co-operative Women's Guild and in 1922, she was elected to represent the Irish guildswomen on the newly formed International Women's Co-operative Committee, which came into existence at Basel.

She was an active member of the Independent Labour Party, and, in 1920, was elected as a Labour councillor for the Dock ward of Belfast.

McCoubrey died on 11 April 1956 in Belfast, Northern Ireland.

References 

1880 births
1955 deaths
People from Renfrewshire
Irish suffragists
Members of Belfast City Council
Independent Labour Party politicians
Women councillors in Northern Ireland
Co-operative Women's Guild